Nasir Khan Janjua (HI(M)) is a retired three-star rank army general who served as the National Security Advisor of Pakistan from 23 October 2015 to 27 June 2018. Janjua has previously commanded the Southern Command & XII Corps in Quetta and briefly tenured as the president of the National Defence University in 2012.

Prior to be appointment as NSA, Janjua's name was mentioned as a possible replacement for Sartaj Aziz in Pakistan's news media after meeting with Prime Minister Nawaz Sharif. Janjua was confirmed and appointed as NSA after moving the NSA staff to Prime Minister's Secretariat on 23 October 2015.
He resigned from his job on June 27, 2018.

Biography

Janjua went to Fc college Lahore where he completed his Intermediate, later selected in Pakistan Army long course. Janjua is a graduate from the 59th Class of the PMA at the Pakistan Military Academy and the National Defence University (NDU) where he studied political science; he got his commissioned into the Punjab Regiment. His military career saw an active action in Siachen against the Indian Army and commanded a Brigade, as a Brigadier, in 2005. Janjua later coordinated relief operations in Azad Kashmir in the aftermath of the massive earthquake in Pakistan in 2005.

In 2006, he was posted as director at the Directore-General of Military Operations (DGMO) and served under Lieutenant-General (retired) Ahmad Shuja Pasha (later DG ISI). He also took part in military negotiation with Indian Army on 23 May 2006 to avoid military accidents at the LoC. In 2007, he was promoted as Major-General and held two-star assignment as DG of Directore-General of Military Operations (DGMO) in 2007; however, the appointment was short-lived and was posted as GOC of the 17th Infantry Division. From 2007 to 2008, Major-General Janjua took participation in combat operations in Swat and oversaw the Rah-e-Haq in 2007. After Rah-e-Haq, Janjua's division was reverted to I Strike Corps which was posted at the Indo-Pakistani border. Forces under his command were put on alert to deter possible hostile actions by the Indian Army in the aftermath of the Mumbai attacks in 2008.

In 2011, Janjua was appointed as the Vice-Chief of General Staff at the GHQ in Rawalpindi and was promoted as Lieutenant-General to continue upon the three-star assignment. In 2012, Janjua was appointed as the president of the National Defence University where he also served on the teaching faculty and instructed courses on war studies and political science. His appointed was later commented by military analyst, Ikram Sehgal, as instrumental "in changing the curricula and the "Lal Kurti" mindset to reflect modernity in warfare, combining the National Security and War Course into one course instead of two overlapping ones."

On 20 August 2013, Lieutenant-General Janjua was posted as field commander of the XII Corps in Quetta, Balochistan, Pakistan. Janjua worked closely with Chief Minister Dr. Abdul Malik Baloch in stabilising the Balochistan and supervised firsthand counter-insurgency and counter-terrorism operations against a variety of militant groups in the restive Balochistan province. From sectarian militias to alleged Indian-sponsored separatist groups, Janjua had been a witness to some of the most vicious interference in Pakistan.

National Security Adviser (Oct 2015–June 2018)

In October 2015, Janjua retired from the military service and received honorary discharge to hand over the command of XII Corps to Lieutenant-General Aamir Riaz. His new assignment at the National Security Council was first broke by political analyst, Najam Sethi, at his programme format, Aapas ki Baat, aired by Geo News. Since then, Pakistan's news media began circulating the news of Janjua being appointed as NSA. Janjua's appointment as NSA was viewed to provide co-ordinate to Sartaj Aziz to concentrate on foreign policy which were being ignored due to his hectic engagement as per demand of the dual offices, quoted by the officials in Islamabad. Furthermore, it was also noted that, Janjua's appointment as NSA will take off the burden from Interior Minister Nisar Ali Khan's shoulders who has long been holding counter-terrorism talks with British government. The National Security Council staff that functioned under Sartaj Aziz was located at the Foreign Office, and the NSC staff was posted back to Prime Minister's Secretariat on immediate effect.

On 6 December 2015, Janjua travelled to Thailand to hold the national-security level talks with India. Janjua's visit to Bangkok, the first in his role as national security adviser, was held a meeting with Indian counterpart Ajit Doval that discussed terrorism, conflict resolution involving in Jammu and Kashmir, and other bilateral issues and agreed to take forward the "constructive" engagement.
In October 2017, he suggested US Ambassador to Pakistan David Hale, setting up an empowered “US Political Authority” can help to seek political solution for unending Afghan war.
He resigned from his job on June 27, 2018.

References

External links 
 General Janjua meets Afghan counterpart

Punjabi people
People from Quetta
Pakistan Military Academy alumni
National Defence University, Pakistan alumni
Pakistani political scientists
Academic staff of the National Defence University, Pakistan
Pakistani generals
Recipients of Hilal-i-Imtiaz
Pakistani diplomats
Nawaz Sharif administration
Year of birth missing (living people)
Living people